Company is a monthly magazine for the Hungarian LGBT community, freely available in gay venues of Budapest. It provides news, reports, reviews and advertisements. It has been published since December 2009, replacing Na végre!. It is published in A5 size, on 30-60 pages.

See also 
Mások
Na végre!

References

External links 
 
 

2009 establishments in Hungary
Free magazines
Hungarian-language magazines
LGBT-related magazines published in Hungary
Magazines established in 2009
Magazines published in Budapest
Monthly magazines